Kloka is a village in the municipality of Topola, Serbia. According to the 2002 census, the village had a population of 1,146.

References

Populated places in Šumadija District